Jean-Yves Laforest (born June 13, 1949 in Shawinigan, Quebec) is a Canadian former Member of Parliament.

Background

Before he entered politics, Laforest was an administrator by profession.

Member of Parliament

He was first elected to the House of Commons of Canada in the 2006 federal election representing the Bloc Québécois for the riding of Saint-Maurice—Champlain. He sat in the Bloc Québécois Shadow Cabinet as critic for the Economic Development Agency of Canada for the Regions of Quebec. He lost his riding to the NDP in the 2011 federal election.

Briefly after TQS, a Quebec-based TV network, announced that it would abolish its information services division, Laforest introduced legislation that would create a separate branch of the Canadian Radio-television and Telecommunications Commission for Quebec.

Footnotes

External links
 

1949 births
Bloc Québécois MPs
Living people
Members of the House of Commons of Canada from Quebec
People from Shawinigan
21st-century Canadian politicians